The 2020-21 season is Port's 4th consecutive seasons in top flight after promoted back from Thai League 2 in 2017. Also, as Port won the 2019 Thai FA Cup, they are qualified to the preliminary round 2 of 2020 AFC Champions League. In this season,  Port participates in 4 competitions which consisted of the Champions Cup, Thai League, FA Cup, and AFC Champions League.

On March 1, all Thai League 1 matches between 7 and 31 march will be played behind closed doors as broadcast-only events. However, on March 4, the decision changed to postpone all of matches prior to 18 April due to the coronavirus pandemic in Thailand.

It was later confirmed that the match will be restarted in September 2020 and end in May 2021.

Squad

Transfer

Pre-season transfer

In

Loan In

Out

Return from loan

Loan Out

Mid-season transfer

In

Loan In

Out

Return from loan

Loan Out

Late-season transfer

In

Loan In

Out

Return from loan

Loan Out

Competitions

Thailand Champions Cup

Thai League 1

Thai FA Cup

Thai League Cup

AFC Champions League

Team statistics

Appearances and goals

Overall summary

Season summary

Score overview

Notes

References 

POR
Port F.C. seasons